Afrodite Zegers (Dutch pronunciation: æ-fɹəʊ-daɪ-ti, born 2 December 1991) as Afrodite Kyranakou) is a Greek born Dutch competitive sailor. She competed at the 2016 Summer Olympics in Rio de Janeiro in the women's 470 class, and at the 2020 Summer Olympics in Tokyo in the women's 470 class.

References

External links
 
 
 
 

1991 births
Living people
Dutch female sailors (sport)
Dutch people of Greek descent
Olympic sailors of the Netherlands
Sailors at the 2016 Summer Olympics – 470
Sailors at the 2020 Summer Olympics – 470